North Middletown is a home rule-class city in Bourbon County, Kentucky, in the United States. The population was 643 as of the 2010 census. North Middletown is part of the Lexington-Fayette Metropolitan Statistical Area.

History
North Middletown was incorporated in 1818; the prefix "North" was intended to avoid repetition with similarly-named Middletown, Kentucky. A post office called North Middletown has been in operation since 1819.

Geography
North Middletown is located at  (38.144514, -84.108148) in southeastern Bourbon County.

Demographics

As of the census of 2000, there were 562 people, 217 households, and 156 families living in the city. The racial makeup of the city was 96.98% White, 1.60% African American, 0.18% from other races, and 1.25% from two or more races. Hispanic or Latino of any race were 0.71% of the population.

There were 217 households, out of which 36.9% had children under the age of 18 living with them, 51.6% were married couples living together, 13.8% had a female householder with no husband present, and 28.1% were non-families. 22.1% of all households were made up of individuals, and 12.4% had someone living alone who was 65 years of age or older. The average household size was 2.59 and the average family size was 3.00.

In the city, the population was spread out, with 26.2% under the age of 18, 8.2% from 18 to 24, 31.5% from 25 to 44, 23.3% from 45 to 64, and 10.9% who were 65 years of age or older. The median age was 36 years. For every 100 females, there were 90.5 males. For every 100 females age 18 and over, there were 86.9 males.

The median income for a household in the city was $34,038, and the median income for a family was $37,000. Males had a median income of $31,042 versus $21,750 for females. The per capita income for the city was $14,606. About 11.8% of families and 14.5% of the population were below the poverty line, including 12.1% of those under age 18 and 35.0% of those age 65 or over.

References

Cities in Bourbon County, Kentucky
Cities in Kentucky